The Baden Baden International  also known as the Baden-Baden  tennis tournament and the Baden Baden Invitational was a tennis event held from 1896 through 1966 in Baden-Baden, Baden-Württemberg, Germany on outdoor Clay courts.

History
The Baden Baden tournament was first held in 1896 played at the Baden Baden Lawn Tennis Club (today called the Rot-Weiss Tennis Club), Baden-Baden, Germany the tournament fluctuated between July, August, and September over the course of its run the tournament survived for 55 years with various breaks due to the first and second world wars.

Champions
Notes: Challenge round: The final round of a tournament, in which the winner of a single-elimination phase faces the previous year's champion, who plays only that one match. The challenge round was used in the early history of tennis (from 1877 through 1921)  in some tournaments not all.

Men's singles
{Incomplete roll)

Women's singles
(incomplete roll)

See also
History of tennis

Notes

References
 Lawn Tennis and Badminton Magazines, 1896–1901, Amateur Sports Publishing Co. Ltd., London, UK.
 Lawn Tennis and Croquet Magazines, 1901–1920, Amateur Sports Publishing Co. Ltd., London, UK.
 Tennis:Cultural History, Gillmeister, Heiner, A&C Black, 1998, .

External links
TennisBase Baden Baden roll of honour

Clay court tennis tournaments
Defunct tennis tournaments in Germany